Robert Bouvier (1886–1978) was a Swiss philosopher noted for popularising the work of Ernst Mach in French.

Bouvier spent much his career teaching evening classes and doing translation work before becoming a privatdocent at the University of Geneva.

Publications
 (1923) La Pensée de Ernst Mach: Essai de biographie intellectuelle et critique Paris: Vélin d'Or

References

1886 births
1978 deaths
Academic staff of the University of Geneva
20th-century Swiss philosophers